Industrial manslaughter, for example in Australian Capital Territory law, is a crime where the action or inaction of an employer results in the death of an employee.  Industrial manslaughter usually has a much broader scope than standard criminal manslaughter.

Industrial manslaughter legislation is a common demand of trade unions, to allow the criminal prosecution of owners and employers for workplace deaths.

Implementation
The Australian Capital Territory has provisions for industrial manslaughter introduced in 2004. ACT Crimes Act 1900 (A1900-40) R32 13 July 2004 p44

In 2017, industrial manslaughter became an offence in Queensland in their workplace health and safety legislation, the Work Health and Safety Act 2011.

Despite the offence existing in four jurisdictions as of 2020, there have been no successful prosecutions.

Demands for Industrial manslaughter in NSW
In New South Wales provisions for industrial manslaughter were demanded by the trade union movement after the adolescent building industry worker Joel Exter fell off a domestic roof and died.  Joel's union, the CFMEU conducted a significant campaign around his death.  The Labor Party (ALP) government of NSW under Bob Carr denied that industrial manslaughter provisions were necessary as Workcover already has provisions for dealing with industrial death.  The trade union movement argued that the manslaughter provisions of Workcover were ineffective, as reflected by a lack of prosecution of employers for workplace death.

Party positions on Industrial Manslaughter
The NSW Liberal Party does not believe specific industrial manslaughter provisions to be necessary.

The NSW section of the Australian Greens believes that industrial manslaughter should be a federal crime.

Victoria Passes Workplace Manslaughter Legislation 
The Victorian Parliament passed the Workplace Safety Legislation Amendment (Workplace Manslaughter and other matters) Bill 2019 on 26 November 2019 and is expected to come into effect on a day to be proclaimed or, at the latest, 1 July 2020.

References

Australian criminal law
Australian labour movement
Manslaughter
Australian Capital Territory law
Workplace health and safety in Australia